Khirbat as Sahilah  is a small village in the Madaba Governorate of western Jordan.

References

Populated places in Madaba Governorate